Old Beast is a 2017 Chinese drama film written and directed by Zhou Ziyang, and produced by Wang Xiaoshuai and Liu Xuan. The story mainly takes place in the city of Ordos in Inner Mongolia.

Cast
 Tu Men as Lao Yang
 Wang Chaobei as Bing
 Su Feng as Liang
 Yi Danna as Lixia 
 Wang Mingshuo as Mei
 Alatengwula as Lu
 Hao Qiaoling as Lao Yang's wife
 Wang Zizi as Lili
 Sun Jiaqin as Qin
 Yan Liyang

Awards and nominations

References

External links

2017 films
Chinese drama films
2017 drama films
Films set in Inner Mongolia
Films shot in Inner Mongolia
2017 directorial debut films
2010s Mandarin-language films